Krishna Pancham Khopde (born 6 March 1959) is also known as a member of the 13th Maharashtra Legislative Assembly, in India. He represents the Nagpur East Assembly Constituency. He belongs to the Bharatiya Janata Party (BJP). He is BJP sitting member, having been a member of the 12 Maharashtra Legislative Assembly too. Khopde in 2014 was the chief of the Nagpur City BJP. In 2009 he created a major upset defeating 5 time MLA Satish Chaturvedi of the Indian National Congress. Khopde was a corporator in the Nagpur Municipal Corporation and a standing committee chairman. Khopde is a high school dropout.

His political career commenced in the early nineties, when he became President of the Bharatiya Janata Yuva Morcha (youth wing of the BJP) in Nagpur. At the age of 33, Khopde became the Municipal Corporator of the Nagpur Municipal Corporation and served as corporator for 5 consecutive terms, in 1992 to 2014. He was the Deputy Mayor elected in Nagpur Municipal Corporation India, when he served as the Deputy Mayor of Nagpur Municipal Corporation at the age of 36, in 1995-1996.

Early life
Khopde was born to Kamla Khopde and Pancham Khopde. His parents have 4 sons & 4 daughters.

Early career
He was an active member of Indian National Congress before joining BJP.

Family and personal life
Krishna Khopde married Sandhya in 1991. They have two sons named Abhilash & Rohit.

Political career
In 1992, at age 33, Khopde was elected as a Corporator from Satnami Nagar ward. Three years later Khopde became the Deputy Mayor of the Nagpur Municipal Corporation. In 2008, he was elected to the Standing Committee Chairman Nagpur Municipal Corporation. In 2009 he was elected to the Maharashtra Legislative Assembly for the first time. He was serving his second term as MLA as of 2014.

Positions held

Within BJP

Office Bearer, Nagpur (East) BJP 
Nagpur President, BJYM 
Nagpur President, BJP (24 March 2012 to 12 Jan 2013)
Re-elected Nagpur President, BJP Since 12 Jan 2013

Legislative

Deputy Mayor, Nagpur Municipal Corporation Nagpur City – (1995 to 1996)
Standing Committee Chairman Nagpur Municipal Corporation - (2008-2009)
Member, Maharashtra Legislative Assembly - Since 2009

References

Living people
Maharashtra MLAs 2009–2014
1959 births
Maharashtra MLAs 2014–2019
Indian municipal councillors
Maharashtra municipal councillors
Marathi politicians
Bharatiya Janata Party politicians from Maharashtra
Politicians from Nagpur
Maharashtra MLAs 2019–2024